Altavista Downtown Historic District is a national historic district located at Altavista, Campbell County, Virginia. It encompasses 48 contributing buildings in the central business district of Altavista. Notable buildings include the Altavista Municipal Building (1938), U.S. Post Office (1938), Altavista Presbyterian Church (1925), Central Baptist Church (1927), Southern Railway station (1936), Ogden-Henderson Building (1909), First National Bank (1917) by Stanhope Johnson (1882-1973), Leggett's department store (1933), and Vista Theater (1936).

It was listed on the National Register of Historic Places in 2010.

References

Historic districts in Campbell County, Virginia
National Register of Historic Places in Campbell County, Virginia
Historic districts on the National Register of Historic Places in Virginia